Loxococcus rupicola is a species of palm tree, and the only species in the genus Loxococcus. It is endemic to Sri Lanka. It is threatened by habitat loss.

References

Areceae
Endemic flora of Sri Lanka
Critically endangered plants
Monotypic Arecaceae genera
Taxonomy articles created by Polbot
Taxa named by Hermann Wendland
Taxa named by Carl Georg Oscar Drude